The 1886 Penn Quakers football team was an American football team that represented the University of Pennsylvania during the 1886 college football season. In its second year under head coach Frank Dole, the team compiled a 9–7–1 record.

Schedule

References

Penn
Penn Quakers football seasons
Penn Quakers football